Lac-Édouard station is a Via Rail station in Lac-Édouard, Quebec, Canada. It is a request stop consisting of an unmanned shelter.

Considering the fact that the village of Lake Edward was away from main roads, the railway artery was a key to economic development in the region. This railway, linking Montreal to Chambord, via Junction Garneau, greatly favored forestry, sanatorium (since 1904) and tourist activities. Lake Edward railroad station was the key point of transit of passengers and goods before the construction of roads.

See also

 Lac-Edouard, Quebec
 Lake Edward Sanatorium

External links

Via Rail stations in Quebec
Railway stations in Mauricie
La Tuque, Quebec